The Missouri Department of Economic Development (DED) is an agency of the government of Missouri. The department was made to support economic growth in Missouri and help local communities to grow and prosper.  It is overseen by a department director appointed by the Missouri Governor and confirmed by the Missouri Senate.

Organization 
The Department of Economic Development has several different divisions and agencies that work together to promote the economy of Missouri;

Divisions 

 Administrative Division
 Strategy and Performance Division
 Regional Engagement Division
 Missouri One Start Division
 Business and Community Solutions Division
 Tourism Division

Agencies 

 Missouri Women's Council
 Broadband Development Office
 Missouri Technology Corporation
 Missouri Development Finance Board
 Missouri Community Service Commission
 Missouri Housing Development Commission

References

External links 
 Official Website
2019-2020 Official Manual of the State of Missouri.
 Publications by or about the Department of Economic Development at Internet Archive.

Government of Missouri
Economy of Missouri
State agencies of Missouri
State departments of economic development in the United States